Martha Louise “Märta” Andersson (also known as Märta Ingemansson and Märta Karlsson)  (14 February 1925 – 2 December 2018) was a Swedish gymnast who competed in the 1948 Summer Olympics.

References

1925 births
2018 deaths
Swedish female artistic gymnasts
Olympic gymnasts of Sweden
Gymnasts at the 1948 Summer Olympics
20th-century Swedish women